Hanover Park is a neighborhood of the City of Cape Town in the Western Cape province of South Africa

In February 1980 the neighborhood was the starting point of a national prolonged school boycott in protest of apartheid laws and policies. Although Hanover Park is its own neighborhood separate from Philippi to its south it is situated within the Philippi police precinct area.casecade court

Hanover Park currently has a very high crime rate.

Notable people 
 Benni McCarthy, South African footballer
 Albert Fritz, South African politician

References

Suburbs of Cape Town